Leigh is a small coastal community in the north of the Auckland Region of New Zealand. It lies on the west side of Omaha Cove, a small inlet within Omaha Bay to the south of Cape Rodney. It is 13 km from Matakana, 21 km from Warkworth and approximately 92 km north of Auckland City.

Leigh is the nearest town to Cape Rodney-Okakari Point Marine Reserve surrounding Te Hāwere-a-Maki / Goat Island. The reserve, the first of its type in New Zealand, is also the location for the University of Auckland's Marine Laboratory.

Demographics
Leigh is part of the larger Cape Rodney statistical area.

Leigh had a population of 606 at the 2018 New Zealand census, an increase of 36 people (6.3%) since the 2013 census, and an increase of 105 people (21.0%) since the 2006 census. There were 261 households, comprising 306 males and 300 females, giving a sex ratio of 1.02 males per female, with 99 people (16.3%) aged under 15 years, 72 (11.9%) aged 15 to 29, 279 (46.0%) aged 30 to 64, and 162 (26.7%) aged 65 or older.

Ethnicities were 92.1% European/Pākehā, 16.8% Māori, 3.0% Pacific peoples, 1.5% Asian, and 3.0% other ethnicities. People may identify with more than one ethnicity.

Although some people chose not to answer the census's question about religious affiliation, 59.9% had no religion, 26.7% were Christian, 1.0% had Māori religious beliefs, 1.0% were Muslim, 1.0% were Buddhist and 3.5% had other religions.

Of those at least 15 years old, 105 (20.7%) people had a bachelor's or higher degree, and 96 (18.9%) people had no formal qualifications. 84 people (16.6%) earned over $70,000 compared to 17.2% nationally. The employment status of those at least 15 was that 207 (40.8%) people were employed full-time, 96 (18.9%) were part-time, and 6 (1.2%) were unemployed.

Cape Rodney statistical area
Cape Rodney statistical area, which also includes Ti Point and Whangateau, stretches north to the border with Kaipara District and west almost to Wellsford.

Cape Rodney had a population of 3,525 at the 2018 New Zealand census, an increase of 429 people (13.9%) since the 2013 census, and an increase of 765 people (27.7%) since the 2006 census. There were 1,275 households, comprising 1,785 males and 1,740 females, giving a sex ratio of 1.03 males per female. The median age was 45.0 years (compared with 37.4 years nationally), with 687 people (19.5%) aged under 15 years, 489 (13.9%) aged 15 to 29, 1,683 (47.7%) aged 30 to 64, and 663 (18.8%) aged 65 or older.

Ethnicities were 92.2% European/Pākehā, 15.4% Māori, 3.5% Pacific peoples, 2.0% Asian, and 2.6% other ethnicities. People may identify with more than one ethnicity.

The percentage of people born overseas was 16.9, compared with 27.1% nationally.

Although some people chose not to answer the census's question about religious affiliation, 59.4% had no religion, 27.9% were Christian, 1.6% had Māori religious beliefs, 0.2% were Hindu, 0.1% were Muslim, 0.3% were Buddhist and 2.3% had other religions.

Of those at least 15 years old, 555 (19.6%) people had a bachelor's or higher degree, and 495 (17.4%) people had no formal qualifications. The median income was $32,100, compared with $31,800 nationally. 453 people (16.0%) earned over $70,000 compared to 17.2% nationally. The employment status of those at least 15 was that 1,329 (46.8%) people were employed full-time, 558 (19.7%) were part-time, and 48 (1.7%) were unemployed.

Recreation

The Leigh district provides several venues for rugby, golf, touch rugby, football and other sports. The Rodney district's rugby team, the "Rodney Rams", is based at Whangateau with clubrooms at Whangateau Reserve. The reserve is also used for local touch rugby tournaments.

There are a number of beaches close to Leigh including Te Hāwere-a-Maki / Goat Island, Mathesons Bay, Whangateau, Pakiri and Omaha. There are also numerous fishing spots and seafood hunting areas. Goat Island Marine Reserve provides several organised features including scenic marine observations, glass-bottom boat trips and scuba-diving; fishing is strictly prohibited.

"Daniel's Reef" is the most well known surfing spot in the Leigh area.

The Leigh Carnival is a fundraiser for the school and is held every Easter Sunday on the Leigh School field. The Leigh Volunteer Fire Brigade hosts an annual fishing competition.

Media 

The Leigh community newspaper is the Leigh Rag.

The Mahurangi Matters and Rodney Times newspapers are also delivered in the area.

Marae

The local Ōmaha Marae is a traditional meeting ground for Ngāti Manuhiri, and its associated iwi of Ngātiwai. It includes Te Kiri meeting house.

Education 

Leigh School is the local primary school. It is a coeducational contributing primary (years 1-6) school with a roll of  students as of  The school was established in 1874. The adjacent Leigh Community Preschool accepts children from age 6 months to 5 years.  The two schools work together to provide a seamless, minimally stressful transition for children entering school.  A number of children living in Leigh attend the much larger Matakana Primary, 10 km distant.  Homeschooling is also popular in the Leigh area.

High school students are served by Mahurangi College in Warkworth and Rodney College in Wellsford. There are no intermediate schools in the Greater Warkworth District, therefore The Ministry of Education has referred intermediate students to the nearby colleges.

Economy 
Leigh is primarily a fishing village. It exports fresh fish both nationally and internationally.

References

External links

Leigh Primary School
Business Association Leigh Webpage (Leigh by the Sea)

Populated places in the Auckland Region
Rodney Local Board Area
Matakana Coast